Herbert Edward Ball (July 27, 1918 – April 18, 2000) was an American professional basketball player. He played for the Chicago Bruins in the National Basketball League for six games during the 1940–41 season and averaged 0.5 points per game.

References

1918 births
2000 deaths
American men's basketball players
United States Navy personnel of World War II
Basketball players from Chicago
Chicago Bruins players
Forwards (basketball)
Guards (basketball)
Junior college men's basketball players in the United States
Western Kentucky Hilltoppers basketball players
Robert Lindblom Math & Science Academy alumni